András Kern (born 28 January 1948 in Budapest) is a Hungarian actor, producer, writer, singer and comedian.

Life 
In 1965 Kern produced a film with a friend, entitled Mi Lesz? (What will happen?), and subsequently won first prize in the 13th Hungarian National Amateur Film Festival.

In 1970 he graduated from the Academy of Drama and Film in Budapest. He has appeared in numerous films, has written and appeared in many radio sitcoms as well as in many popular Hungarian TV shows such as Heti Hetes and Activity Show. He dubbed Woody Allen in several movies.

Selected filmography
 Stars of Eger (1968)
 141 Minutes from the Unfinished Sentence (1975)
 A Pogány Madonna (1981)
 Oh, Bloody Life (1984)
 Out of Order (1997)
 6:3 Play It Again Tutti (1999)

See also
Hungarian pop

References

External links 

 András Kern Filmography on PORT.hu

1948 births
Living people
Hungarian male film actors
Hungarian Jews